Mariane Paviasen (born ) is a Greenlandic politician. She was elected to the Inatsisartut, the parliament of Greenland, during the 2021 general election. She is a member of the Inuit Ataqatigiit party and a vocal opponent to uranium mining.

Early life and career 
Mariane Paviasen was born in either 1964 or 1965.

She is a staunch critic of uranium mining. She was concerned about plans to operate an open-pit mine in Narsaq, which would have exposed residents to uranium. No") movement in response. She publicly raised her concerns about uranium mining with Erik Jensen, the minister for mineral resources, in a 2019 town hall meeting. Prior to her election in the Greenlandic parliament, she worked for a helicopter company at Narsaq.

Political career 
Paviasen was elected to the Inatsisartut for the Inuit Ataqatigiit party in April 2021. She and  challenged the lobbying efforts of mining groups, and the Greenlandic public favored her party as a result. The agricultural industry was one of the most impassioned supporters of her group, since they believed their meat products would no longer be purchased due to concerns over radioactivity. She said Greenland risks "being left with a country that cannot be used for anything" unless action is taken to preserve the natural environment.

She became the minister for housing and infrastructure in November 2021. As minister, she said that in response to new airport in Qaqortoq that may have an impact on one in Narsarsuaq, a working group should investigate.

References

Citations

Bibliography

 
 
 
 
 
 
 
 

21st-century Greenlandic politicians
21st-century women politicians
Anti-uranium activists
Greenlandic women in politics
Government ministers of Greenland
Inuit Ataqatigiit politicians
Living people
Women government ministers of Greenland
Year of birth missing (living people)